Cubelles is a municipality in Catalonia, in the province of Barcelona, Spain. It is situated in the comarca of Garraf.

Culture 
A 2005 film by the Spanish director Paco Plaza, "Cuento de navidad" (The Christmas Tale), part of the film series Películas para no dormir (Films to Keep You Awake), was set in the town.

References

External links 
 
  
 Government data pages 

Municipalities in Garraf